Stories from a Flying Trunk is a 1979 film based on three stories by Hans Christian Andersen. It was devised, written and directed by Christine Edzard and produced by John Brabourne and Richard Goodwin.

The music by Giacchino Rossini was arranged by John Dalby, and the  choreography was by Frederick Ashton. The film stars Murray Melvin as H. C. Andersen, and Ann Firbank, John Tordoff, John Dalby, Patricia Napier and dancers of the Royal Ballet.

The stories the film is based on are The Kitchen, in which household objects come to life, The Little Match Girl, which updates Andersen's tale to the East End of London in the late 1970s, and Little Ida, with dance featuring members of the Royal Ballet.

Production
Stories from a Flying Trunk was  made as three short films when Edzard and Goodwin moved into two disused warehouses in Rotherhithe and equipped them with a small film studio.

It was the second collaboration between Edzard and Goodwin, following their entry into film in 1970 with a screenplay of The Tales of Beatrix Potter.

It was released on DVD in 2016.

Reception
An AllMovie.com reviewer described the film's Little Match Girl as suffering "an impecunious existence in London's East End", and in the Little Ida story, in which "a love of dancing is embodied in the performances of the two dancers from the Royal Ballet", "dancers take on the roles of garden variety vegetables in undoubtedly one of their more unusually costumed performances."

References

External links
 

1979 animated films
Films based on works by Hans Christian Andersen